Mauricio Aceves (born 18 December 1960) is a Mexican former professional boxer in the Light welterweight division. He was the first ever WBO Lightweight Champion.

Professional career
Mauricio has fought many undefeated boxers, including Shane Mosley, Dingaan Thobela, Todd Foster, Dennis Holbæk Pedersen, Billy Schwer and Rene Arredondo.

WBO Lightweight Championship
Aceves won the WBO Lightweight Championship by upsetting the veteran Amancio Castro in Santa Ana, California.

He almost lost his championship in his first defense, when his opponent Bejines had won every round before being knocked out with a single short left hook by Mauricio. He had to survive cuts over both eyes.

One of his last fights was a loss to boxing legend Jorge Páez.

See also
List of Mexican boxing world champions
List of WBO world champions
List of lightweight boxing champions

References

External links

Boxers from Mexico City
World Boxing Organization champions
World lightweight boxing champions
Lightweight boxers
1960 births
Living people
Mexican male boxers